Thomas Belasyse, 1st Earl Fauconberg PC (c. 1627 – 31 December 1700) was an English peer. He supported the Parliamentary cause in the English Civil War, becoming close to Oliver Cromwell and marrying Cromwell's third daughter, Mary. After the Restoration of the monarchy he became a member of the Privy Council to Charles II and was elevated to an earldom by William III.

Biography

Belasyse was the only son of Henry Belasyse, and Grace Barton; his grandfather, Thomas Belasyse, 1st Viscount Fauconberg, was a Royalist, who went into exile after being defeated at Marston Moor in 1644. 

Unlike his Royalist father and grandfather, Belasyse supported Parliament in the English Civil War, and subsequently became a strong adherent of Oliver Cromwell, whose third daughter, Mary, he married in 1657. His father died in 1647 and he succeeded his grandfather to the viscounty of Fauconberg in the Bishopric of Durham in 1652.

Career

Belasyse again became a Royalist at the Restoration of the monarchy, and was appointed a member of the Privy Council of England by Charles II and Captain of the Guard (in which office he succeeded his uncle Lord Belasyse). He also served as English ambassador in Venice. He was Lord Lieutenant of the North Riding of Yorkshire (1660–1692). He was one of the noblemen who joined in inviting William of Orange to England, and was by that king created Earl Fauconberg, in the Peerage of England, on 9 April 1689.

Fauconberg died on 31 December 1700, and was buried in the family vault in Coxwold. He had no children; on his death, the earldom became extinct, but his viscountcy passed to his nephew, Thomas Belasyse, 3rd Viscount Fauconberg.

Family
On 3 July 1651 Fauconberg married Mildred, daughter of Nicholas Saunderson, 2nd Viscount Castleton. She died 8 May 1656. On 18 November 1657, he married Mary Cromwell, the third daughter of Oliver Cromwell. She outlived her husband by thirteen years dying on 14 March 1713.

Bibliography
While he was in Italy, Fauconberg translated and published the Histoire du gouvernement de Venise, by Abraham Nicolas Amelot de la Houssaye.

Arms

See also
 Green Ribbon Club, post-restoration political club of which Fauconberg was a member. The Green Ribbon had been used as the badge of the Levellers in the English Civil Wars, in which many of them had fought, and was an overt reminder of their radical origins.
  – ship built at Whitby that became a Greenland whaler and was lost there in 1821.

References

Attributionn

Sources
 
Grant, Peter, "Belasyse [née Cromwell], Mary, Countess Fauconberg (bap. 1637, d. 1713)", Oxford University Press 2004–2008, Bellasis family 1500–1653, page 7. Website of Ingilby History, Retrieved 5 March 2010
Nicolas, Sir Nicholas Harris & Courthope, William. The historic peerage of England: exhibiting, under alphabetical arrangement, the origin, descent, and present state of every title of peerage which has existed in this country since the Conquest ; being a new edition of the "Synopsis of the Peerage of England", John Murray, 1857

Further reading
Stater, Victor "Belasyse, Thomas, first Earl Fauconberg (1627/8–1700)", Oxford University Press 2004–2008, Bellasis family 1500–1653, pages 5,5. Website of Ingilby History, Retrieved 5 March 2010

External links
Two songs at the marriage of the Lord Fauconberg and the Lady Mary Cromwell, by Andrew Marvell. 

|-

|-

|-

1627 births
1700 deaths
Earls in the Peerage of England
Lord-Lieutenants of Durham
Lord-Lieutenants of the North Riding of Yorkshire
Members of the Privy Council of England
Honourable Corps of Gentlemen at Arms
Viscounts Fauconberg
Ambassadors of England to the Republic of Venice
Ambassadors of England to France